Istigobius ornatus, the Ornate goby, is a species of gobies found in the Indo-Pacific.

See also 
 List of fishes of India
 List of reef fish of the Red Sea

References 

 Murdy, E.O. and D.F. Hoese, 1985. Revision of the gobiid fish genus Istigobius. Indo-Pac. Fish. (4), page 41

External links 
 Istigobius ornatus at FishBase

Gobiidae
Fish described in 1830